The 2014 South American Rugby Championship (Confederación Sudamericana de Rugby (CONSUR) Championship) Division A was the first edition of the newly formatted South American Rugby Championship, that included promotion and relegation. Unlike previous years, a host country or city was not chosen, rather CONSUR opted to spread the tournament around South America. This was the first time since 1981 that Argentina did not compete due to the new format of the competition.

Changes from 2013
 An additional level above CONSUR Division A was added, with Argentina only competing in the 2014 CONSUR Cup
 Paraguay was promoted from 2013 South American Rugby Championship "B"
 The top 2 teams from CONSUR A in 2014 will play in the 2015 CONSUR Cup

Standings

Pre-tournament rankings are in parentheses.

Matches
The dates and venues were announced on 23 April.

Round 1

Round 2

Round 3

See also
 2014 CONSUR Cup
 2014 South American Rugby Championship "B"
 2014 South American Rugby Championship "C"

References

2014
2014 rugby union tournaments for national teams
A
rugby union
rugby union
rugby union
rugby union
International rugby union competitions hosted by Uruguay
International rugby union competitions hosted by Chile
International rugby union competitions hosted by Paraguay
International rugby union competitions hosted by Brazil